Julia Blake (born13 th march 1936) is an English–born Australian actress. She is known for her small screen role as Nancy McCormack on the Australian drama series Prisoner (Prisoner: Cell Block H), for which she appeared during the final season in 1986. She appeared in two earlier roles in the series, as Evelyn Randall (1981) and Alice Dodds (1983).
 
She won the 1989 AFI (AACTA) Award for Best Actress in a Miniseries for Eden's Lost, and the 1990 AFI (AACTA) Award for Best Supporting Actress for her role opposite Max von Sydow in the film Father. She also received AFI nominations for Travelling North (1987), Innocence (2000) and The Boys are Back (2009).

Personal life 
Blake was born in Bristol, England, and studied drama at Bristol University. She married the Australian actor, later politician, Terry Norris in England in 1962, and they both moved to Australia, while working in repertory theatre in Yorkshire in 1962 (proquest). She has appeared in roles in theatre since 1963.

In 2018, she and Norris jointly received the Equity Lifetime Achievement Award. Their daughters are the actresses Sarah and Jane Norris.

Filmography

Film

Television

Honours and awards

References

External links

1936 births
Date of birth uncertain
Living people
Actresses from Bristol
Australian expatriates in England
Australian film actresses
Australian soap opera actresses
Australian stage actresses
Best Supporting Actress AACTA Award winners
English expatriates in Australia
English film actresses
English soap opera actresses
English stage actresses
English television actresses
20th-century Australian actresses
21st-century Australian actresses
20th-century English actresses
21st-century English actresses